The Camelots may refer to:

The paramilitary wing of Action Française in the 1930s Camelots du Roi
The Camelots (doo wop group), 1960s, led by Davie Nichols
The Camelots (rock band), 1960s, led by  Mike Appell